Martin Goldschmidt is the co-founder and managing director of UK independent record label Cooking Vinyl and co-founder of Essential Music & Marketing.

Early career
Goldschmidt attended the Polytechnic of Wales (now the University of South Wales) in the mid 1970s. Goldschmidt's involvement in music began in 1982 when he founded management company and booking agency Forward Music. The company was subsequently renamed FAB in 1988 and later sold to Rob Challice/CODA in 1997. Between 1984 and 1986 Goldschmidt also ran independent record label Forward Sounds International.

Cooking Vinyl
Cooking Vinyl was founded in 1986 by Goldschmidt and his former business partner Pete Lawrence, initially operating out of Goldschmidt's council house in Stockwell, South London. Over 25 years on the label has diversified from its original folk roots into releasing rock, metal, indie, punk and electronica. Cooking Vinyl is also recognised as a pioneer of ‘artist services’ deals working with artists such as Billy Bragg, The Prodigy and Marilyn Manson.

In 2003 Goldschmidt and former Vital Distribution MD Mike Chadwick set up independent distributor and service provider Essential Music & Marketing, which operates as part of the Cooking Vinyl Group.

In 2005 Cooking Vinyl, led by Goldschmidt, set up one of the UK's earliest online distribution companies, Uploader, which was sold in 2007 to the Independent Online Distribution Alliance (IODA).

Personal life
Goldschmidt is a proficient chess player, notably taking home the title of Sydney Junior Chess Champion in 1974, during a period living in Australia.

Goldschmidt has also previously founded two national Anti Nuclear protest groups: Students Against Nuclear Energy (SANE) and No Nukes Music.

Industry honours and other achievements
Goldschmidt was nominated as Independent Entrepreneur of the Year at the inaugural Association of Independent Music (AIM) Independent Music Awards.

References

External links
 Martin Goldschmidt biography on IMPALA website
 Martin Goldschmidt biography on MusicTank website
 Cooking Vinyl Website

Year of birth missing (living people)
Living people
British record producers
British music industry executives
Alumni of the University of South Wales